The Newcastle Ridge is a mountain ridge on Vancouver Island, British Columbia, Canada, located on the south side of Johnstone Strait between Adam River and Sayward. It is part of the Vancouver Island Ranges which in turn form part of the Insular Mountains.

See also
List of mountain ranges

References

External links

Vancouver Island Ranges
Ridges of Canada
Northern Vancouver Island